The Miss Kenya is the oldest national pageant in Kenya which promotes Environmental Conservation, Culture, Tourism and Goodwill. This pageant is unrelated to Miss Universe Kenya or Miss World Kenya.

History
The Miss Kenya founded in 1960 and internationally competed at the Miss World competition. 

 In recent years the Miss Kenya Organization, the organizing body of Miss Kenya Beauty pageant, has made a comeback with the acquisition of the Miss International, Miss Earth and Miss Grand International franchises. In preceding years, most beauty queens representing Kenya at the Miss Earth contest were handpicked. The last director of Miss Kenya is Tony Chirah.

Titleholders

1960-2012

2015
In 2015, the winners of Miss Kenya divided into three titleholders which mean they are winners. Miss Kenya - Charity Mwangi.

2016-Present

Representatives at Big Four pageants

Miss International
Color key

Miss Earth
Color key

Began in 2014 Miss Kenya titleholder may compete at the Miss Earth pageant. The Miss Kenya expected to be environment ambassador of Kenya. Before joining Miss Kenya, Miss Earth Kenya titleholders were selected by casting.

References

Kenya
Kenya
Beauty pageants in Kenya